Todd's paresis (or postictal paresis/paralysis, "after seizure") is focal weakness in a part or all of the body after a seizure. This weakness typically affects appendages and is localized to either the left or right side of the body. It usually subsides completely within 48 hours. Todd's paresis may also affect speech, eye position (gaze), or vision.

The condition is named after Robert Bentley Todd (1809–1860), an Irish-born London physiologist who first described the phenomenon in 1849. It may occur in up to 13% of seizure cases.  It is most common after a focal motor seizure affecting one limb or one side of the body. The generally postulated cause is the exhaustion of the primary motor cortex, although no conclusive evidence is available to support this.

Presentation

The classic presentation of Todd's paresis is a transient weakness of a hand, arm, or leg after focal seizure activity within that limb.  The weakness may range in severity from mild to complete paralysis.

When seizures affect areas other than the motor cortex, other transient neurological deficits can take place.  These include sensory changes if the sensory cortex is involved by the seizure, visual field defects if the occipital lobe is involved, and aphasia if speech, comprehension or conducting fibers are involved.

Postictal paresis (PP), although familiar to neurologists, has not been well-studied. One retrospective observational study evaluated 328 selected patients from ages 16 to 57 years who had prolonged video-electroencephalogram (EEG) monitoring for medically intractable epilepsy and focal seizure onset; those with nonepileptic seizures, status epilepticus, and Lennox-Gastaut syndrome were excluded. The following observations were made:
 PP occurred in 44 patients (13.4 percent)
 PP was always unilateral and always contralateral to the seizure focus
 The mean duration of PP was 174 seconds (range 11 seconds to 22 minutes)
Of all seizures followed by PP, the following features were noted:
 Obvious ictal motor activity was seen in 78 percent (Todd's paresis is more common after any clonic seizure activity)
 Very slight ictal motor activity was seen in 10 percent
 No ictal motor activity was seen in nearly 10 percent
 The most common ictal lateralizing sign was unilateral clonic activity in 56 percent
 Ictal dystonic posturing occurred in 48 percent
 Ictal limb immobility occurred in 25 percent
The results of this study are valuable because few other data exist on the frequency, duration, and seizure characteristics associated with PP. However, the study is likely biased by the inclusion only of patients with medically intractable seizures who had undergone video-EEG monitoring, and the results may not extrapolate to a general epilepsy population.

Other post-ictal neurological findings that do not involve activity of the area affected by the seizure have been described.  They are thought to be caused by a different mechanism than Todd's paresis, and including paralysis of the contralateral limb, and rare genetic causes of hemiplegia and seizures.

Causes
The cause of Todd's paresis has been attributed to the affected cortex being ‘exhausted’ or silenced due to increased inhibition, but these conjectures are not supported. It has been observed that the impairments that follow seizures are similar to those that follow strokes, where for a period of time blood flow to certain areas of the brain is restricted and these areas are starved of oxygen.

Diagnosis

The most significant issue regarding the Todd's paresis is its differentiation from a stroke. The issue is further complicated by the fact that some strokes trigger a focal seizure during the acute phase. A Todd's paresis in this context may overestimate the extent of neurological deficit due to the vascular process itself resulting in erroneous decisions with regards to acute stroke therapy  such as thrombolysis. For this reason, a seizure during an acute stroke is generally accepted to be a relative contraindication to thrombolytic therapy, especially in the absence of documented cerebrovascular occlusion using vascular imaging techniques.

An infant with Todd's paresis does not necessarily preclude the diagnosis of a febrile convulsion. This view is as a result of a recent study that showed the incidence of Todd's paresis to be in 0.4% of infants that have been diagnosed with a febrile convulsion.

Treatment
There is no treatment for Todd's paralysis. Individuals must rest as comfortably as possible until the paralysis disappears.

Prognosis

An occurrence of Todd's paralysis indicates that a seizure has occurred. The prognosis for the patient depends upon the effects of the seizure, not the occurrence of the paralysis.

References

External links

Cerebral palsy and other paralytic syndromes